George Every (3 February 1909 – 2 September 2003) was a British historian, theologian, writer on Christian mythology and poet.

Life
George Every was born, along with a twin brother Edward, on 3 February 1909 in Tipton St John, Devon where his father, also George Every, was the village vicar.  George, Edward and their sister Mary (born 1911) spent the majority of their youth with their parents, and extended family in the East Devon area.
Every was a member of the Anglican religious community the Society of the Sacred Mission at Kelham, Nottinghamshire from 1929 to 1973. He then became a Roman Catholic and taught at Oscott College. He was known as a historian of Byzantium and was in some ways a follower of Christopher Dawson.

Every encountered T.S. Eliot at Kelham and introduced him to the history of Little Gidding, later to be the title for one of Eliot's Four Quartets through his draft verse play Stalemate at Little Gidding.  On the occasion, in 1948, of Eliot's sexagenarianism, Every wrote for a dedicatory compendium a piece on the poet's religious leanings and its broader significance.

Works 
 Christian Discrimination (1940)
 Selected Poems (Staples Press, c. 1946) with S. L. Bethell, J. D. C. Pellow 
 The Byzantine Patriarchate 451-1204 (1947)
 Poetry and Personal Responsibility. An Interim Report on Contemporary Literature (1949)
 The High Church Party 1688-1718 (1956)
 Lamb To The Slaughter (1957)
 Studies In Ministry and Worship: The Baptismal Sacrifice (1959)
 Basic Liturgy (1961)
 No Pious Person by Herbert Kelly (1960) editor
 Misunderstandings between East and West (1965)
 Christian Mythology (1970)
 New Heaven? New Earth? An Encounter with Pentecostalism (1976) Peter Hocken, John Orme Mills, Simon Tugwell
 Understanding Eastern Christianity (1978)
 The Mass - Meaning, Mystery and Ritual (1978)
 The Time of the Spirit - Readings Through the Christian Year (1984) anthology, editor with Richard Harries, Kallistos Ware
 Christian Legends (1987)
 A Christmas Collection (2001)

External links 
Times obituary

Bibliography 
 Every, Brother George SSM. "The Way of Rejections." In T. S. Eliot: A Symposium, edited by Richard March and Tambimuttu, 181-188. London: Editions Poetry, 1948.

Notes 

1909 births
2003 deaths
Members of Anglican religious orders
British male poets
20th-century British poets
20th-century British historians
20th-century British male writers
People from East Devon District
People from Newark and Sherwood (district)